Break the Ice (BTI) was a hardcore punk festival held in Melbourne, Australia in 2012, 2013, and 2014. It was run by Broken Hive Records and though short-lived, it was a significant event in the Australian hardcore calendar, attracting hundreds of punters each year.

History
The festival began in 2012 as the feature date on the national tour for well-known band Trapped Under Ice. Inspiration for the fest comes from similar styled multi-day hardcore punk festivals in the USA such as This Is Hardcore and Sound and Fury. In 2013 the festival turned into a 2-day event with a more purposeful focus on other aspects of the hardcore music scene consisting of a trade market place, a bigger presence of local DIY labels, stalls selling vegan baked goods and an increased sense of community. However, the subsequent 2014 event would be the last.

2012
Saturday 10 March
Trapped Under Ice
50 Lions
Hopeless 
Shinto Katana 
Dropsaw
Iron Mind
In Trenches
Relentless
Phantoms
Anchor (SWE) 
Warbrain
Endless Heights

2013
Saturday 27 April
Cold World
Miles Away
Iron Mind
50 Lions
Phantoms
Survival
Endless Heights
Vigilante
Free World
Reincarnation

Sunday 28 April
Bane
Hopeless
Relentless
Warbrain
The Weight
The Others
Outright
Thorns
Civil War
Machina Genova

Rotting Out from the US were due to play day two of the 2013 lineup but pulled out and cancelled their Australian tour set for the same period for unannounced reasons.

2014
Saturday 10 May
Ringworm
Mindsnare
Twitching Tongues
Iron Mind
I Exist
Against
Shackles
Colossus
Mood Swing
Manhunt
Born Free

Sunday 11 May
Misery Signals
Foundation
Disgrace
Endless Heights
Warbrain
Blkout
Outright
The Others
Starvation
Legions
Downside

See also

List of punk rock festivals

References

External links
Broken Hive Records official site

Music festivals in Melbourne
Punk rock festivals
Rock festivals in Australia
Music festivals established in 2012
Heavy metal festivals in Australia